The greater jumprock (Moxostoma lachneri) is a riverine species of catostomid fish native to Georgia and Alabama in North America.

Relationship with humans 
The world record for greater jumprock stands at 1lb 4oz taken from the Flint River in Georgia, USA in 2012.

Footnotes 

 

Moxostoma
Fish described in 1956